The discography of Nerina Pallot, an English pop rock singer-songwriter, consists of seven studio albums, twenty seven extended plays, fifteen singles (including one as a featured artist) and twelve music videos. Following a brief development deal with EMI, she signed a recording contract with Polydor Records in 2000.

Pallot's debut studio album, Dear Frustrated Superstar, was released in August 2001. It reached number 98 on the UK Albums Chart and produced two singles, "Patience" and "Alien". Due to the poor commercial performance of Dear Frustrated Superstar, Pallot was released from Polydor Records and established her own independent record label, Idaho Records. In 2004, the singer collaborated with the electronic music duo Delerium on the single "Truly", which charted at number 54 in the UK and number 2 on the United States Billboard Hot Dance Club Songs chart.

Fires, Pallot's second studio album, was released in April 2005. It charted at number 21 on the UK Albums Chart and was certified gold by the British Phonographic Industry (BPI), selling 42,525 copies as of May 2006. Five singles, "Damascus", "All Good People", "Everybody's Gone to War", "Sophia" and "Learning to Breathe", were released from Fires. "Everybody's Gone to War" reached number 14 on the UK Singles Chart and number 41 on the Australian Singles Chart, while "Sophia" peaked at number 32 on the UK Singles Chart and at number 48 on the Swedish Singles Chart.

Pallot self-produced and recorded her third studio album, The Graduate, which was released in October 2009. It entered the UK Albums Chart number 46 and produced two singles: "Real Late Starter" and "I Don't Want To Go Out". Her fourth studio album, Year of the Wolf, followed in June 2011. The album debuted at number 31 in the UK and produced three singles: "Put Your Hands Up", "Turn Me on Again" and "All Bets Are Off".

Between December 2013 and December 2014, Pallot wrote, recorded and released a series of extended plays, with one released for each month of the year. Pallot's fifth studio album, The Sound and the Fury, was released in September 2015; it was preceded by the single "The Road".

Albums

Studio albums

Compilation albums

Live albums

Extended plays

Singles

As a main artist

As a featured artist

Promotional singles

Other appearances

Music videos

Notes

A  Fires was reissued with a new track listing and artwork in the United Kingdom on 24 April 2006.
B  Year of the Wolf was reissued with additional tracks in the UK on 27 January 2012 as New Year of the Wolf.
C  "Everybody's Gone to War" did not enter the Belgian Ultratop 50 chart in Flanders, but peaked at number 10 on the Flemish Ultratip chart.
D  "Everybody's Gone to War" did not enter the Belgian Ultratop 40 (now Ultratop 50) chart in Wallonia, but peaked at number 17 on the Walloon Ultratip chart.
E  "Everybody's Gone to War" did not enter the Dutch Top 40, but peaked at number 29 on the Tipparade chart, which acts as a 30-song extension to the main Dutch Top 40 chart.

References

External links
 
 

Discographies of British artists
Pop music discographies